The IMSA SportsCar Championship, currently known as the IMSA WeatherTech SportsCar Championship under sponsorship, is a sports car racing series based in the United States and Canada and organized by the International Motor Sports Association (IMSA). It is a result of a merger between two existing North American sports car racing series, the American Le Mans Series and Rolex Sports Car Series. At its inception, the name was United SportsCar Championship, which subsequently changed to IMSA SportsCar Championship in 2016. Rolex SA's Tudor brand was the championship's title sponsor in 2014 and 2015, and since 2016 WeatherTech has served as title sponsor.

The season begins with its premier race, the Rolex 24 at Daytona, the last weekend of January and ends with the Petit Le Mans, another North American Endurance Cup race, in early October.

History
On September 5, 2012, it was announced that the Grand-Am Road Racing sanctioning body would merge with the Braselton-based  International Motor Sports Association, and as such, both bodies would merge their premiere sports car series, the Rolex Sports Car Series and American Le Mans Series respectively, with plans to debut in 2014. On November 20, 2012, the merger committee announced that SME Branding were selected to develop the name, logo and identity of the new series.

On January 8, 2013, the two series' announced a preliminary class structure for the new merged series. Grand-Am's Daytona Prototype category and IMSA's P2 would combine into a single-prototype class, with allowances for the unique DeltaWing to also compete in the new class. The Le Mans Prototype Challenge class of single spec cars from the American Le Mans Series would continue as is, although the cars were to switch to Grand-Am's Continental Tires. The GT class of the American Le Mans Series would remain unchanged, while Grand-Am's GT class will form another GT class, and be combined with the American Le Mans GTC category. The only category of cars not represented in the new series is the American Le Mans Series' P1 category.

The reveal date for the new series was March 14, 2013 at the Chateau Élan Hotel and Conference Center at Sebring International Raceway, two days before the 12 Hours of Sebring. American Le Mans CEO Scott Atherton announced the new sanctioning body would remain IMSA while Ed Bennett revealed the new titles for the series' five classes. SME Branding Senior Partner Ed O'Hara then announced the new United SportsCar Racing title and logo, a name submitted through a contest won by Louis Satterlee of Florida, a racer in the Florida Karting Championship Series.

On August 9, 2013, Fox Sports 1 announced it had signed a TV contract with IMSA to televise the entire USCC season between 2014 and 2018.

Later, on September 12, 2013, Tudor was announced as the title sponsor for the series, which was named the United SportsCar Championship. On August 8, 2015, WeatherTech was announced as the new title sponsor for the series, renaming the series to the WeatherTech SportsCar Championship, starting with the 2016 season.

Beginning with the 2019 season, the series is covered exclusively by NBC Sports in the United States. The NBC broadcast network will air nine hours of coverage annually, with the majority of the coverage airing on NBCSN. CNBC and the NBC Sports app will provide supplemental coverage. Beginning with 2022, USA Network replaced NBCSN as the cable home to the series.

Michelin Pilot Challenge 

Originally based on a Canadian series before being acquired by Grand-Am, the Continental Tire Sports Car Challenge (originally known as Grand-Am Cup) is a production-based touring car series. The series is split into two classes known as Grand Sport (GS), intended for large capacity GT-style cars, and Street Tuner (ST), consisting of smaller sedans and coupes, some of which are front-wheel drive. The IMSA Continental Tire Sports Car Challenge until 2013 supported some Rolex Series races but also headlined some of its own dates. This series continued with the United SportsCar Championship after the merger and is somewhat comparable to the old Trans Am Series.

Class structure
There are five classes in the IMSA SportsCar Championship series, featuring three sports prototype categories and two grand tourer classes:

Sports Prototypes:

 Grand Touring Prototype (GTP): The flagship class of the championship that replaced the DPi (Daytona Prototype International) class starting in 2023, featuring cars built to IMSA's LMDh and Automobile Club de l'Ouest's Le Mans Hypercar regulations.

 Le Mans Prototype 2 (LMP2): A class introduced since 2019 after being split from the DPi class (2019-2022), it features pro-am driver lineups. The class features cars built by Automobile Club de l'Ouest's (ACO) 4 licensed manufacturers (Riley-Multimatic, Ligier, Oreca and Dallara) to the specifications of the FIA/ACO 2017 Global LMP2 regulations.

 Le Mans Prototype 3 (LMP3): Introduced in the 2021 season, having been in the IMSA Prototype Challenge category as one of the feeder series to the IMSA WeatherTech SportsCar Championship, this class of prototypes features cars built according to ACO's 2020 LMP3 Generation II ruleset specifications from manufacturers such as Ligier, ADESS, Ginetta & Duqueine Engineering.

Grand Touring classes:

 GT Daytona Pro (GTD Pro): A class that utilizes the FIA GT3 specifications that replaced the GTLM class starting in the 2022 Season. No driver class restriction in the GTD Pro class.

 GT Daytona Pro-AM (GTD): A class since 2016 that uses same specification cars as GTD Pro, but at least 1 silver or bronze driver must be in a team. And more than 1 platinum driver in a team is prohibited.

Some races may only use selected classes of cars, for example: Any class car may be permitted entry into the Rolex 24, while at the Grand Prix of Long Beach only the Daytona Prototype International (DPI) and GT Le Mans (GTLM) are entered. LMP2 and GTLM classes are compatible with regulations for the 24 Hours of Le Mans.

Former classes
There were four classes formerly used in the IMSA SportsCar Championship series, featuring three sports prototype categories and one grand tourer class:

Sports Prototypes:

 Daytona Prototype International (DPi): The former flagship class of the championship from 2019-2022, featuring cars built to IMSA's Daytona Prototype International regulations, which are based upon the 2017 Le Mans Prototype LMP2 cars. Previously, the DPi's had competed against their base LMP2 counterparts in the Prototype class from 2017 to 2018. Starting in 2019 the LMP2 cars were split into a separate class. The Prototype class had originally consisted of Grand-Am's Daytona Prototypes with the American Le Mans Series LMP2 prototypes, and the DeltaWing, before the original Daytona Prototypes, and the DeltaWing were phased out of competition at the end of 2016, and replaced by the new DPi cars. Starting in 2023, the DPi class was replaced by the Grand Touring Prototype (GTP) class in an effort to further improve the racing in the Prototype class, as well as create a closer bond to the FIA World Endurance Championship.

 Prototype (P): The former flagship class of the championship from 2014-2018 before splitting into two separate classes in 2019, featuring cars built to which included classes of prototypes carried over from the previous motorsport category series of the American Le Mans Series and the Grand-Am Rolex Sports Car Series. These cars were Daytona Prototypes, LMP2 prototypes & the Nissan DeltaWing. Starting in 2017 the original Daytona Prototypes, and the DeltaWing were phased out of competition, and replaced by the new DPi cars. At the end of the 2018 WeatherTech SportsCar Championship season this class would be split into two separate classes, DPi & LMP2 for the following season in 2019.

 Prototype Challenge (PC): This was a one-make spec class in which all cars that drivers and teams used were Oreca FLM09 LMPC's powered by 6.2L Chevrolet V8 engines which made 430hp each. This class would be used from the 2014 season until the end of the 2017 season.

Grand Touring classes:

 GT Le Mans (GTLM): A continuation of the ALMS GT class, it consisted of cars matching the ACO's GTE specification and competed in the series between the 2014 and 2021 seasons.

Circuits

Champions

IMSA Championship

Drivers

Teams

Manufacturers

Tires

Michelin Endurance Cup (MEC)

Note: From 2014–2018 this championship was known as Patrón North American Endurance Cup

Drivers

Teams

Manufacturers

WeatherTech Sprint Cup (WTSC)

Note: Introduced in 2019 this Cup Trophy is only eligible for GTD Class (GT Daytona) Drivers, Teams & Manufacturers

Drivers

Teams

Manufacturers

References

External links
IMSA official site
WeatherTech SportsCar Championship official site

 
Auto racing series in the United States
Auto racing series in Canada
Sports car racing series
Group GT3
International Motor Sports Association
2014 establishments in the United States
Recurring sporting events established in 2014